Florimond Claude, comte de Mercy-Argenteau (20 April 1727 – 25 August 1794) was an Austrian diplomat.

Biography
He was born in Liège, Belgium, to Antoine, comte de Mercy-Argenteau, and entered the diplomatic service of Austria in Paris in the train of Reichsfürst Kaunitz. He became Austrian ambassador in Turin at the court of King Charles Emmanuel III of Sardinia, in St. Petersburg at the court of Catherine the Great, and then Austrian ambassador in Paris at the court of King Louis XV of France in 1766. In Paris, his first work was to strengthen the alliance between France and Austria, which was cemented in 1770 by the marriage of the dauphin, afterwards Louis XVI, with Archduchess Maria Antonia of Austria, youngest daughter of Empress Maria Theresa, afterwards known as Queen Marie Antoinette.

When Louis and Marie Antoinette ascended the throne of France in 1774, Mercy-Argenteau became one of the most powerful personages at the French court due to his influence over Marie-Antoinette, which made her unpopular with the French nobility and French people. He was in Paris during the turbulent years that led up to the French Revolution, and gave powerful aid to the finance ministers Loménie de Brienne and Necker. In 1792, he became governor-general of the Austrian Netherlands, which had just been reduced to obedience by Austria. There, his ability and experience made him a very successful ruler. Although at first in favor of moderate courses, Mercy-Argenteau supported the action of Austria in making war upon its former ally after the outbreak of the French Revolution, and in July 1794, he was appointed Austrian ambassador to Britain, but he died a few days after his arrival in London.

In popular culture
He was played by Henry Stephenson in the 1938 film Marie Antoinette, and by Steve Coogan in the 2006 film of the same name.

See also
 Sébastien Dubois, Inventaire des archives de la famille de Mercy-Argenteau (1334-1959), Bruxelles, Archives de l'Etat, 2009, 2 vol. (Archives de l'État à Liège. Inventaires, 110).
 T. Juste, Le Comte de Mercy-Argenteau (Brussels 1863)
 A. von Arneth and A. Geoff roy,  (Paris 1874)
 A. von Arneth and J. Flammermont,  (Paris 1889–1891)
 Mercy-Argenteau's  has been condensed and translated into English by Lilian Smythe under the title of A Guardian of Marie Antoinette (2 vols., London 1902)

Notes

References

1727 births
1794 deaths
People from Liège
Walloon people
Austrian diplomats
Ambassadors to the Kingdom of Sardinia
Ambassadors of Austria to Russia
Ambassadors of Austria to France